Mathías Nicolás Laborda Malseñido (born 15 September 1999) is a Uruguayan professional footballer who plays as a right-back or centre-back for Major League Soccer club Vancouver Whitecaps.

Career
Before making his professional debut. Laborda has been scouted several times by the Spanish football club Barcelona.

Laborda made his professional debut on 8 May 2019, in a 1–1 draw against Cerro Porteño. He came in as a substitute in the 55th minute of the match.

He made his league debut on July 28, 2019, in a 4-2 win against Club Atlético Progreso. He played all 90 minutes and scored one of the goals.

On 9 January 2023, it was announced that Laborda would join Major League Soccer side Vancouver Whitecaps on a 3-year deal.

References

1999 births
Living people
Association football defenders
Club Nacional de Football players
Vancouver Whitecaps FC players
Uruguayan footballers
People from Fray Bentos
Uruguay youth international footballers